Lecosia is a genus of flowering plants belonging to the family Amaranthaceae.

Its native range is Eastern Brazil.

Species:

Lecosia formicarum 
Lecosia oppositifolia

References

Amaranthaceae
Amaranthaceae genera